The Casa Vilaplana (Vilaplana house) is a private building at 8 Joan Cantó street in the city center of Alcoy (Alicante), Valencian Community, Spain.

Building 
The building was designed by the Valencian architect Vicente Pascual Pastor in 1906. It is an example of Valencian Art Nouveau architecture of the early twentieth century.

It was commissioned by Enrique Vilaplana Juliá, president of the Alcoy's Savings bank, for his reivate residence. In the proximities it got up with posteriority realized by the same architect, the headquarters of the banking entity.

The entire facade is made of masonry with a very singular design. The building has two floors.

References

Bibliography 
 Doménech Romá, Jorge (2010). Modernismo en Alcoy, su contexto histórico y los oficios artesanales. Editorial Aguaclara. pp. 319–326. .

See also 
 Art Nouveau in Alcoy

External links 

Casa Vilaplana in Alcoy Tourism

Art Nouveau architecture in Alcoy
1906 establishments in Spain